The Rugby League Conference (RLC) (also known as the Co-operative Rugby League Conference as a result of sponsorship from The Co-operative Group), was a series of regionally based divisions of amateur rugby league teams spread throughout England, Scotland, and Wales.

The RLC was founded as the 10-team Southern Conference League in 1997, with teams from the southern midlands and the south east, but has subsequently, rebranded and expanded both geographically and numerically to include around 90 teams stretched across almost the whole of Great Britain from Aberdeen in northern Scotland down to Plymouth on the south coast of England.

The aim of the RLC was initially to provide regular fixtures for new clubs based outside the 'heartland' of rugby league, although as the playing standards increased, it also accepted teams from the 'heartlands'. The hope is that, at least some of these clubs, would eventually progress to become semi-professional clubs that could one day join the 'traditional' clubs in Championship 1; to date, London Skolars have done so with both Hemel Stags and Oxford Rugby League joining in 2013, Coventry Bears in 2014 and Nottingham Outlaws will join Championship 1 in the 2016 season.

With the top heartlands amateur league, the National Conference League voting to move to a summer season, the 2012 season saw a re-alignment of the amateur game and the Rugby League Conference was replaced with a series of regional leagues.

History

The Southern Conference League was founded as a 10-team competition in 1997. The following season it was rebranded as the Rugby League Conference due to its intentions to include teams from all non-heartland parts of the country and its even then inclusion of several teams outside the South.

The league steadily expanded over the first few seasons right up to the fringes of the heartlands, before expanding into Wales for the first time in 2001 with the addition of Cardiff Demons. The league expanded into the North East that same season.

In 2003 National League Three was founded including some of the stronger Rugby League Conference clubs and some BARLA clubs. This same season saw massive expansion of the Rugby League Conference including an entire Welsh division. The league also pushed its borders further including more teams from the less rugby league playing areas of the counties considered the heartlands and went as far south west as Somerset.

The league expanded further in 2004 by allowing entry to heartland clubs. For the 2005 season the competition was split into two tiers, with Premier divisions being created for above the existing regional divisions. The next major changes were in 2007 when National League Three (as the National Division) and the Scottish League became integral parts of the Rugby League Conference structure.

The Rugby League Conference celebrated passing the 100 club barrier in 2010.RLC set to expand

2011 was the last season before the league was split up into multiple leagues.

Representative fixtures

The Rugby League Amateur Four Nations was competition for national amateur sides from England, Scotland, Wales, and Ireland.

Former divisions within the RLC

There were many changes in format of the Rugby League Conference as it expanded over time, here are the divisions that existed when the league was lasted competed for in 2011.

National Division
The premier divisions: North East Premier, North West Premier, Scottish Premier, Southern Premier, Welsh Premier, Midlands Premier, Yorkshire Premier
The regional divisions: East, London & South, North East, North West, South West, Welsh Championship, West of England
The feeder leagues: Yorkshire & Humber Merit League, North West Merit League, Midlands Merit League, London and South East Merit League

Successor leagues

Tier Four
National Conference League
Premier Division
Division One
Division Two
Division Three
Conference League South

Tier Five
 Yorkshire League, North West League, Cumbria League, Barrow & District League, North East League, Pennine Championship, Hull & District League, Midlands League, South West League, East League, London & South East League, South Premier, North Wales Conference, South Wales Premiership, Scottish National League

Women's Rugby League Conference
In 2011 the following teams will play in the Women's Rugby League Conference:

Central Division: Bradford Thunderbirds, Brighouse Ladies, Dudley Hill Diamonds, Keighley Cats, West Craven Warriors
North East Division: Featherstone Rovers, Hunslet Hawks, Peterlee Pumas, Leeds Akkies, Stanningley, Whinmoor
North West Division: Chorley Panthers, Leigh East, Leigh Miners Rangers, Mancunians RL, Wigan Ladies
South Division: Coventry Bears, Nottingham Outlaws, Royal Air Force, Royal Navy, The Army, West London Sharks
West Division: Crossfields, Halton, Macclesfield, Warrington, Widnes Moorfield

Past winners

Rugby League Conference National

 2003 Warrington Woolston Rovers (now Warrington Wizards) (as National League three)
 2004 Coventry Bears (as National League three)
 2005 Bradford Dudley Hill (as National League three)
 2006 Bramley Buffaloes (as National League three)
 2007 Featherstone Lions
 2008 Crusaders Colts
 2009 Bramley Buffaloes
 2010 Warrington Wizards
 2011 Huddersfield Underbank Rangers

Harry Jepson Trophy

Until 2004, the Harry Jepson trophy was competed for by all the Conference sides. Between 2005 and 2011, it was competed for by the RLC Premier divisions.

From 2012 onwards, it has been contested by the non-heartlands successor leagues.

 1997 North London Skolars (as Southern Conference)
 1998 Crawley Jets
 1999 Chester Wolves
 2000 Crawley Jets
 2001 Teesside Steelers
 2002 Coventry Bears
 2003 Bridgend Blue Bulls
 2004 Widnes Saints
 2005 Bridgend Blue Bulls
 2006 South London Storm
 2007 St Albans Centurions
 2008 Nottingham Outlaws
 2009 West London Sharks
 2010 St Albans Centurions
 2011 Parkside Hawks

RLC Regional

The RLC Regional is open to English sides that are in the regional divisions rather than the Premier divisions. It was introduced in 2005.
 
 2005 Wetherby Bulldogs
 2006 Liverpool Buccaneers
 2007 Widnes Saints
 2008 Moorends-Thorne Marauders
 2009 Northampton Casuals (now Northampton Demons)
 2010 Northampton Demons
 2011 Elmbridge Eagles

See also
 British rugby league system

Notes

References

External links
 Official website
 Unofficial RLC website
 Club directory on official site
 Official tables
 Fixture lists
 Fixtures and results on leaguenews.co.uk

 
Sports leagues established in 1997
1997 establishments in England